The Milan S Lines is a commuter rail system serving the metropolitan area of Milan, Italy.

The system comprises 11 lines serving 124 stations, for a total length of 403 km and is fully integrated with the Milan Metro. There are 415 rides per day with a daily ridership of about 230,000. The network works like a rapid transit system when entering the city center through the Milan Passante, where more lines share the same tracks, considerably decreasing headways.

List of stations

Stations in light-blue background are part of the Milan Passante railway.

See also 
 Milan Metro
 List of Milan Metro stations
 Milan S Lines

Notes and references

External links 
 Trenord official website 
 Line S5 

 
Suburban railway stations
Milan suburban